Black Kite is a 2017 Afghan-Canadian drama film directed by Tarique Qayumi. Starring Haji Gul Aser and Leena Alam. The film was shot quickly over a fortnight where they moved locations to avoid being stopped by the Taliban. The film was screened in the Contemporary World Cinema section at the 2017 Toronto International Film Festival.

References

External links
 

2017 films
2017 drama films
Afghan drama films
Canadian drama films
Dari-language films
Films shot in Afghanistan
2010s Canadian films